The 2000 Arizona Wildcats baseball team represented the University of Arizona during the 2000 NCAA Division I baseball season. The Wildcats played their home games at Frank Sancet Stadium. The team was coached by Jerry Stitt in his 4th season at Arizona. The Wildcats would finish 7th in the Pacific-10 Conference with a record of 8-16, 26-30 overall. This was the Wildcats 1st losing season since Jerry Kindall's final season in 1996.

Previous season 
The Wildcats finished the 1999 season with a record of 33-23 (13-11 Pac-10), good enough for a 3rd place finish in the conference. Arizona was selected to the postseason for the 1st time since 1993 and was placed in the Waco Regional as the 3-seed. The Wildcats would fail to win a game, losing two matches in a row to 2-seed Minnesota and 4-seed Eastern Illinois to be eliminated.

Personnel

Roster

Coaches

Opening day

Schedule and results

2000 MLB Draft

References 

Arizona Wildcats baseball seasons